Frédéric Adam (4 January 1904 – 7 September 1984) was a French conductor, composer and administrator.

Career
Born in Hinsbourg, Alsace, Adam studied in Strasbourg and Paris. He became a répétiteur at the opera house in Strasbourg in 1933, remaining there until his retirement in 1972, including periods as co-director from 1955 to 1960 and director from 1960 to 1972.

Adam mounted the first productions in France of several notable operas including: Wozzeck (1959), Il prigioniero (1961), A Midsummer Night’s Dream and Die Frau ohne Schatten (1965).

His compositions include ballets, symphonies and two operas, Judith (1948, Strasbourg) and Le Voyage vers l'étoile (1954, Strasbourg).

He died in Illkirch-Graffenstaden.

References

1904 births
1984 deaths
20th-century French conductors (music)
20th-century French composers
20th-century French male musicians
French male conductors (music)
French male composers
Music directors (opera)
People from Bas-Rhin